Sigal Erez is an actress, screenwriter, and film producer born into a Moroccan/Jewish family. She best known for her starring role as Miranda in the 2000 American film Across the Line.

Biography 
Sigal Erez was born into a Moroccan/Jewish family. As her father was a merchant marine, Sigal was exposed to life and cultures in various countries, from Chile to Israel. She comes from an international family, in which 4 languages are spoken. Sigal moved to the United States on her own to enroll in and complete the Lee Strasberg full program in New York. Her ability to write, act, and direct was quickly recognized. She was later accepted to a master's program in screenwriting at UCLA's acclaimed Writer's Program. She thinks outside of the box, and has always been ahead of her time. In 2000, Sigal wrote, co-produced, and played the lead role in the Boarder-Thriller American film Across the Line.

Across the Line went on to win the Silver Award at the Worldfest Houston, and opened the Latin Film Festival in San Diego, California. Sigal played an illegal immigrant from Guatemala, who was ultimately portrayed as a hero and protagonist. While people loved the story, they were not in favor of portraying an illegal immigrant as the protagonist. However, Sigal insisted, and in 2020, Across the Line is available on multiple platforms and has been viewed by over 5 million people.

Sigal also worked as a television writer and created 13 episodes for a TV drama called "Hotel San Miguel" for Televisa, under renowned writer and showrunner, Sabina Berman.

Her screenplay "The Battle of Evermore", co-written with Martin Spottl, advanced to the semi-finals at the prestigious Nichol's Fellowship. Sigal was hired to write creative proposals that led to successful ventures. Sigal has also worked as a ghost writer for various, accomplished figures.

Sigal's Films and scripts have won numerous awards. Her most recent film "Whats Your Number" has been screened at over 20 festivals and has won many awards, including at South Film Arts Festival, finalist at the Nazareth Film Festival, Semi-finalist in the Los Angeles Cinefest, Social Impact Award at the Marina Del Rey Film Festival, and Best Movie at the Anthem Libertarian Film Festival.

Sigal's new TV Pilot made it to the top 100 in the Launch Pad competition Launch Pad. Sigal is currently in pre-production for her Film Serial Beauty, under her production company "High Water Films". 
In September 2020, Sigla wrote and directed two music videos for Mrs. Judith Withmore. 
Sigal is a writer with materials in all genres. She truly believes that the visual media of storytelling is the ultimate tool for breaking assumptions, opening minds, and sharing unique stories with a real impact.

External links 
 
 

American film actresses
American film producers
Living people
20th-century American actresses
American women screenwriters
American women film producers
21st-century American women